Pockar is a surname. Notable people with the surname include:

 Bojan Počkar (1963–1996), Slovenian mountain climber
 Brian Pockar (1959–1992), Canadian figure skater